The Carlton Football Club, nicknamed the Blues, is a professional Australian rules football club that competes in the Australian Football League (AFL), the sport's top professional competition.

Founded in 1864 in Carlton, an inner suburb of Melbourne, Victoria, Carlton quickly became a dominant club in early Australian rules football competitions, and was a foundation member of the Victorian Football Association (VFA), winning the inaugural premiership in 1877.

Carlton's headquarters and training facilities are located in Carlton North at Princes Park, its traditional home ground, and it currently plays its home matches at Docklands Stadium and the Melbourne Cricket Ground. In 2017, Carlton fielded a team in the inaugural season of AFL Women's, its best result thus far being a Grand Final loss in 2019. Carlton also has reserves sides in the Victorian Football League and VFL Women's.

Club history

Early history

The Carlton Football Club was formed in July 1864. In the early days, Carlton became particularly strong competitively and grew a large supporter base. It became a fierce rival to the Melbourne Football Club in early competitions, including the South Yarra Challenge Cup, which it won in 1871. In 1877, Carlton became one of the foundation clubs of the Victorian Football Association, and was a comfortable winner of the premiership in the competition's inaugural season.

Carlton was one of the first clubs to have a player worthy of the superstar tag: champion player George Coulthard, who played for Carlton between 1876 and 1882, and was noted by The Australasian as 'The grandest player of the day'. He died of tuberculosis in 1883, aged 27.

The club won one more VFA premiership, in 1887, but after that, particularly during the 1890s, the club went from one of the strongest clubs in the Association to one of the weaker, both on-field and off-field. In spite of this, the club was invited to join the breakaway Victorian Football League competition in 1897. The club continued to struggle in early seasons of the new competition, and finished seventh out of eight teams in each of its first five seasons.

Jack Worrall to World War I
Carlton's fortunes improved significantly in 1902. The Board elected the highly respected former Fitzroy footballer and Australian test cricketer Jack Worrall, then the secretary of the Carlton Cricket Club, to the same position at the football club. As secretary, Worrall slowly took over the managing of the players, in what is now recognised as the first official coaching role in the VFL. Under Worrall's guidance in the latter part of the 1902 season, Carlton's on-field performances improved, and in 1903 he led Carlton to the finals for the first time.

Carlton built a strong reputation and financial position, and was able to convince many great players to shift to the club from other clubs, or even (in the case of Mick Grace) out of retirement. Worrall led the club to its first three VFL premierships, won consecutively, in 1906, 1907 and 1908. Carlton became the first club in the VFL to win three premierships in a row, and its win–loss record of 19–1 in the 1908 season (including finals) was a record which stood for more than ninety years.

Following these premierships, Carlton went through a tumultuous period off-field. Some players had become frustrated by low payments and hard training standards, and responded by refusing to train or even play matches. The club removed Worrall from the coaching role (he retained the role of secretary), and after significant changes at board level after the 1909 season, Worrall left the club altogether. Many players who had supported Worrall left the club at the end of the season. Then, in 1910, several players were suspected of having taken bribes to fix matches, with two players (Alex Lang and Doug Fraser) both found guilty and suspended for 99 matches. Despite this backdrop, Carlton continued its strong on-field form, reaching the 1909 and 1910 Grand Finals, but losing both.

Carlton fell out of the finals in 1913, but returned in 1914 under coach Norm Clark, and with many inexperienced players, to win back-to-back premierships in 1914 and 1915 VFL seasons. Most football around the country was suspended during the height of World War I, but Carlton continued to compete in a VFL which featured, at its fewest, only four clubs. Altogether, between Jack Worrall's first Grand Final in 1904 and the peak of World War I in 1916, Carlton won five premierships and contested nine Grand Finals for one of the most successful times in the club's history. The only success which eluded the club was the Championship of Australia; Carlton contested the championship three times (1907, 1908 and 1914), with its South Australian opponents victorious on all three occasions.

Between the wars
Through the 1920s and the Great Depression of the 1930s, Carlton maintained a strong on-field presence. The club was a frequent finalist, contesting fourteen finals series between the wars. However, premiership success did not follow, and the club contested only three Grand Finals for just one premiership during this period, and endured the second longest premiership drought (23 years) in the club's history. The drought was broken with the club's sixth VFL premiership in 1938, when former Subiaco and South Melbourne champion Brighton Diggins was recruited by the club to serve as captain-coach.

On-field, Carlton's inter-war period was highlighted by two of its greatest goalkickers: in the 1920s, Horrie Clover (396 goals in 147 games), and in the 1930s, Harry "Soapy" Vallence (722 goals in 204 games), both of which were Carlton career records at the time.

1941–64

The VFL continued to operate through World War II. With the retirement of Diggins, Carlton secured the services of former  coach Percy Bentley, who coached the club for fifteen seasons. Carlton continued to finish in or near the finals without premiership success through the war, before winning the premiership in 1945, one month after peace. In a remarkable season, Carlton languished with a record of 3–6 after nine weeks, but won ten of the remaining eleven home-and-away matches to finish fourth; Carlton then comfortably beat  in the first semi-final, overcame a 28-point deficit in the final quarter to beat Collingwood in the preliminary final, then beat South Melbourne in the notoriously brutal and violent Bloodbath Grand Final.

Carlton contested two more Grand Finals in the 1940s, both against , winning the 1947 Grand Final by a single point, and being comfortably beaten in 1949. Thereafter followed what was then Carlton's weakest on-field period since Worrall's appointment in 1902, with the club reaching the finals only four times between 1950 and 1964. Finishing tenth out of twelve and winning only five matches, 1964 was Carlton's worst VFL season to that point in its history.

Ron Barassi to 1973
A change of president at the end of 1964 heralded the most successful period in the Carlton Football Club's history. Between 1967 and 1988, Carlton missed the finals only three times, contested ten Grand Finals, and won seven premierships.

The period of success began when George Harris replaced Lew Holmes as president of the club, after the 1964 season. Harris then signed  legend Ron Barassi serve as coach from 1965. Barassi was a six-time premiership player and two-time premiership captain at Melbourne during its most successful era, and at the age of 28 was still one of the biggest names in the game. His shift to Carlton remains one of the biggest player transfers in the game's history. Also contributing to Carlton's success was the strength of the Bendigo Football League, to which Carlton gained recruitment access through the VFL's country zoning arrangements.

Under Barassi, Carlton reached three consecutive Grand Finals between 1968 and 1970, resulting in two premierships: 1968 against Essendon and 1970 against traditional rivals Collingwood. The 1970 Grand Final remains one of the most famous matches in football history. Played in front of an enduring record crowd of 121,696, Collingwood dominated early to lead by 44 points at half time, but Carlton kicked seven goals in fifteen minutes after half time to narrow the margin to only three points; after a close final quarter, Carlton won its tenth VFL premiership with a ten-point victory. Carlton won its first and second Championship of Australia titles in 1968 and 1970, beating the SANFL's Sturt Football Club in both seasons.

Carlton missed the finals in 1971, and Barassi left the club at the end of the season, but Carlton returned to prominence the following year, and contested back-to-back Grand Finals. Both matches were against , with Carlton recording a high-scoring victory in 1972, and losing a rough, physical encounter in 1973.

Of the legendary players from the Barassi era, none was more important than John Nicholls, who captained all three premierships and took over as captain-coach upon Barassi's departure. Midfielders Sergio Silvagni and Adrian Gallagher, half-forward Robert Walls, and ruckman Percy Jones were also prominent throughout the Barassi era, and in 1970, Alex Jesaulenko became the first (and to date, only) Carlton forward to kick 100 goals in a season.

1975–82
Carlton continued to play finals through the 1970s without premiership success, and went through several coaches in a short period of time: Nicholls (until 1975), Ian Thorogood (1976–77), Ian Stewart (for only three matches in 1978), and Alex Jesaulenko as playing coach after Stewart's departure. It was not until 1979 that Carlton again reached the Grand Final, defeating  by five points in a close match best remembered for the late goal kicked by Ken Sheldon, after Wayne Harmes tapped the ball into the goalsquare from the boundary line.

After the 1979 season, there was off-field instability at the board level. Percy Jones replaced Jesaulenko as coach in 1980, before  coach David Parkin was recruited in 1981, Carlton's sixth coach in eight seasons.

Despite the off-field troubles, Carlton continued to thrive on-field, and Parkin led the team to back-to-back premierships in 1981 and 1982, with victories in the Grand Finals against Collingwood and  respectively. With its fourteenth premiership in 1982, Carlton overtook Collingwood to become the most successful club in the league's history, based on premierships won – a position it has held either outright or jointly with  since.

Starring on-field during this period for Carlton was Bruce Doull, regarded as one of the best half-back flankers in the history of the league. Wayne Johnston was a prominent centreman/forward, and Carlton had great success recruiting high-profile Western Australian footballers to the club, including Mike Fitzpatrick, Ken Hunter and Peter Bosustow.

1983–2001
In 1983, John Elliott took over the presidency from Ian Rice. On-field, the club endured three consecutive unsuccessful finals campaigns under Parkin before he was replaced by Robert Walls in 1986. Also in 1986, Carlton lured three of South Australia's top young players to the club: Stephen Kernahan, Craig Bradley and Peter Motley. The club reached the next two Grand Finals, losing in 1986 and winning in 1987, both times against . Kernahan went on to become the club's longest serving captain and leading career goalkicker (738 goals), and Bradley became the club games record holder (375 games); Motley's career was unfortunately cut short by a non-fatal car accident in 1987. Carlton had also recruited Stephen Silvagni (son of Sergio) in 1985, who is now recognised as one of the greatest fullbacks of all-time, and secured the league's star player Greg Williams in a trade in 1992.

David Parkin returned to coach the club from 1991 until 2000, and Carlton was a mainstay of the finals throughout most of this time. In 1995, Carlton became the first team to win twenty matches in a home-and-away season (finishing with a record of 20–2), and won the Grand Final against  to claim its sixteenth premiership. Carlton reached two other Grand Finals during the 1990s, losing to Essendon in 1993 and to the Kangaroos in 1999; in 1999, Carlton had come from sixth on the home-and-away ladder to qualify for the Grand Final, famously beating its rival Essendon (the minor premiers) by one point in the preliminary final.

Period of struggle (2002–present)

In 2002, Carlton swiftly fell from being one of the most successful clubs, both on-field and off-field, to one of the least successful. The club had been much slower than others to embrace the AFL Draft as a means for recruitment, so when its champion players from the 1990s began to retire in the early 2000s, on-field performances fell away quickly, and in 2002, the club won the wooden spoon for the first time in its VFL/AFL history; it was the last of the twelve Victorian clubs to win the wooden spoon. At the same time, the club was starting to struggle financially, due to unwise investments under John Elliott – most significantly, building a new grandstand at Princes Park during the 1990s, at a time when other clubs were finding it more profitable to play at the higher-capacity central venues. Then, at the end of 2002, it was revealed that Carlton had been systematically cheating the league salary cap during the early 2000s. The scandal resulted in the loss of draft picks and a fine of $930,000, which exacerbated the club's poor on-field and off-field positions.

In the immediate fall-out from 2002, president John Elliott was voted out by the members, and was replaced with Docklands Stadium CEO Ian Collins. Under Collins, the club shifted its home stadium from Princes Park to Docklands, with the final match played at Princes Park in 2005. Additionally, coach Wayne Brittain was sacked, and replaced with Kangaroos coach Denis Pagan. On-field performances did not improve under Pagan, and overall the club won three wooden spoons and finished in the bottom two five times between 2002 and 2007.

Carlton's overall position began to improve in 2007, when businessman Richard Pratt, Steven Icke and Collingwood's Greg Swann came to the club as president, general manager of football operations, and CEO respectively; although Pratt's presidency lasted only sixteen months, after which he was replaced by Stephen Kernahan, the new personnel stabilised the club's off-field position. Pagan was sacked as coach mid-season after a string of heavy defeats, and was replaced by former club captain Brett Ratten. Then, prior to the 2008 season, Carlton was able to secure a trade for 's Chris Judd, one of the league's best midfielders, to join the club as captain. The time spent at the bottom of the ladder also allowed Carlton to secure three No. 1 draft picks – Marc Murphy, Bryce Gibbs and Matthew Kreuzer – who helped the club's on-field position. Brett Ratten led Carlton to the finals from 2009 until 2011, but was sacked with a year remaining on his contract after the club missed the finals in 2012, and was replaced by former  and  premiership coach Mick Malthouse. Under Malthouse, the club returned to the finals in 2013, but fell to thirteenth in 2014.

Kernahan stepped aside in mid-2014, and was replaced by Mark LoGiudice, who presided over a period of mediocre onfield results. The relationship between Malthouse and the club's quickly and publicly deteriorated; and in early 2015, after giving a radio interview critical of the board, Malthouse was sacked the club going on to finish last. Former Hawthorn assistant coach Brendon Bolton took over as coach from the 2016 season, leading only into his fourth season before he too was sacked after overseeing the team's decline to another wooden spoon in 2018 with a 2–20 record, the worst win–loss record in its VFL/AFL history, followed by an equally weak 1–10 start to the 2019 season. Bolton's replacement, David Teague, helped the club avoid the 2019 wooden spoon, but lasted only two years into a three-year contract without a finals appearance.

LoGiudice handed over the presidency to Luke Sayers in August 2021, and Sayers conducted an extensive independent review of the football department during the second half of that season; Teague was sacked, and Michael Voss was appointed senior coach. Voss led the club to ninth in his first season.

Club symbols

Guernsey
The current Carlton guernsey is plain navy blue, emblazoned with a white CFC monogram (which stands for "Carlton Football Club") on the front, and white numbers on the back. Other than changes to the font of the monogram, this has been Carlton's guernsey continually since 1909. The club has worn navy blue in its uniform since 1871, when colour of the team's caps was changed from orange/yellow. The club's on-and-off field apparel was manufactured by Nike from 1998 until 2019, and by Puma from 2020 until at least 2029.

The team wears navy-blue shorts in home games, and white shorts in away games. Since 2013, Carlton's clash guernsey has generally been predominantly white, with navy blue monogram, numbers and some trimmings. Sky blue and silver clash guernseys have also been used in some seasons.

Nickname
Carlton's official nickname is the 'Blues'. Since the addition of navy blue to the playing uniform in 1871, the club has been known almost universally in print media as the Blues, Dark Blues or Navy Blues. Other colloquial nicknames include Bluebaggers or 'Baggers.

Prior to 1871, when the uniform was predominantly chamois, the club was known informally as the Butchers. After World War II, the club briefly considered changing its nickname to the Cockatoos, but this never formally eventuated; even so, the push was serious enough that newspaper cartoons depicting a Carlton cockatoo were printed around that time.

Club song
Carlton's club song is We Are the Navy Blues. The lyrics are believed to have been written in around 1930 by cousins Irene McEldrew and Agnes Wright, who ran a boarding house for several club players and the latter of whom was the niece of then-coach Dan Minogue. It is sung to the tune of Lily of Laguna, a British 'coon song' often performed in blackface before less racist versions became popular in the mid-20th century. In 2021, Carlton, in a decision partly based on feedback from its indigenous reconciliation action plan committee, rejected a suggestion from Indigenous anti-racism activist Stephen Hagan that the club compose a new tune to sever its connection with the song's racist history.

Home grounds, headquarters, training and administrative base

The club's traditional home ground is Princes Park (currently known as Ikon Park), located in North Carlton. After struggling to find a permanent home venue during its time in the VFA, Carlton established Princes Park as its home venue when it joined the VFL in 1897. The club played most of its home matches at Princes Park every year between 1897 and 2004 (except for 2002, when it played only four home games there), and a single farewell game was staged at the venue in 2005. It was the last of the suburban home grounds to be used in AFL competition. The venue remains Carlton's training and administrative base, and the club's current 40-year lease on the venue with the City of Melbourne runs until 2035.

Since 2005, Carlton has split its home games between Docklands Stadium and the Melbourne Cricket Ground, with matches expecting to draw higher crowds usually played at the Melbourne Cricket Ground. From 2005 until 2014, Docklands Stadium was the club's primary home ground and hosted the majority of Carlton's home games in those years, under a ten-year deal established during Ian Collins' presidency. The Melbourne Cricket Ground became the club's primary home ground from 2015, and has hosted the majority of the club's home games.

Rivalries

They have met six times in Grand Finals, with Carlton successful in all bar the first. Carlton home matches between the club contest the Richard Pratt Cup, and Collingwood home matches are designated as the Peter Mac Cup.

Carlton also has rivalry with Essendon. With 16 premierships apiece, the two teams are the joint most successful teams in the VFL/AFL history.

Club honours

Carlton Team of the Century

Four emergencies were also named: (1) Laurie Kerr, (2) Bob Chitty, (3) Horrie Clover and (4) Rod McGregor. The five players with an asterisk(*) are also members of the AFL Team of the Century – the largest number of any AFL club.

Hall of Fame
The Carlton Football Club established its Hall of Fame in 1987, with nine inaugural inductees. Each year between 1988 and 2001 an additional three to five people were inducted into the Carlton Hall of Fame. After a five-year break, an additional ten people were inducted into the Hall of Fame in 2006. As of May 2016, there have been 77 inductees.

The club added a Legends category to the Hall of Fame in 1997. There are currently fourteen Legends in the Hall of Fame: Craig Bradley, Bert Deacon, Bruce Doull, Alex Jesaulenko, Wayne Johnston, Stephen Kernahan, John Nicholls, Stephen Silvagni and Harry Vallence (all elevated in 1997); Ken Hands (2006); Robert Walls (2011); Geoff Southby (2013); Sergio Silvagni (2016); and David McKay (2021).

Individual awards

John Nicholls Medallists
Known as "Robert Reynolds Trophy" until 2003

Brownlow Medallists

League leading goalkickers
VFL/AFL except where noted. Awarded the Coleman Medal since 1955.

Norm Smith Medallists

Mark of the Year winners

Goal of the Year winners

Leigh Matthews Trophy winners

Australian Football Hall of Fame inductees
Twenty-five people have been inducted into the Australian Football Hall of Fame for their services to football for careers which were either partially or entirely served with the Carlton Football Club. Of those, three have Legend status in the Hall of Fame.

Legends
Ron Barassi, Alex Jesaulenko, John Nicholls

Players
Peter Bedford, Craig Bradley, Horrie Clover, George Coulthard, Bruce Doull, Ken Hands, Ern Henfry, Ken Hunter, Wayne Johnston, Chris Judd,
Stephen Kernahan, Anthony Koutoufides, Rod McGregor, Peter McKenna, Stephen Silvagni, Geoff Southby, Harry Vallence, Robert Walls, Greg Williams.

Coaches
Mick Malthouse, David Parkin, Jack Worrall

Administrators
Mike Fitzpatrick, Sir Kenneth Luke

Current playing squad

Corporate and administration
The Carlton Football Club was founded in 1864, and since 1978 has operated as the incorporated company Carlton Football Club Limited.

Board of directors
President – Luke Sayers

Board members – Craig Mathieson, David Campbell, Patty Kinnersly, Greg Williams, Robert Priestly, Lahra Carey, Tim Lincoln.

Chief Executive Officers
CEOs since 1980.

Sponsorship

Individual records

Most career goals

Most career games

VFL/AFL match records
Most goals in a game: 13 by Horrie Clover vs.  in 1921
Highest score: 30.30 (210) vs. Hawthorn on 12 April 1969
Lowest score: 0.6 (6) vs. Collingwood on 4 June 1898
Greatest winning margin: 140 points vs. St Kilda on 8 April 1985
Greatest losing margin: 138 points vs. Hawthorn on 24 July 2015
Highest losing score: 22.13 (145) v North Melbourne on 15 April 1985
Lowest winning score: 3.6 (24) v South Melbourne on 24 June 1899
Record attendance (home and away game): 91,571, 21 July 2000 at MCG v Essendon
Record attendance (finals match): 121,696, Grand Final, 26 September 1970 v Collingwood.

Reserves team

Carlton operated its own second/reserves team from 1919 until 2002. From 1919 to 1991 the VFL/AFL operated a reserves competition, and from 1992 to 1999 a de facto AFL reserves competition was run by the Victorian State Football League. The Carlton Football Club fielded a reserves team in both of these competitions, allowing players who were not selected for the senior team to play for Carlton in the lower grade. During that time, the Carlton reserves team won eight premierships (1926, 1927, 1928, 1951, 1953, 1986, 1987, 1990). Following the demise of the AFL reserves competition, the Carlton reserves team competed in the new Victorian Football League for three seasons from 2000 until 2002.

The reserves team was dissolved at the end of 2002, and Carlton entered a reserves affiliation with existing VFL club, the Northern Bullants. Under the affiliation, reserves players for Carlton played VFL football with the Northern Bullants. The partnership between the two clubs was strengthened in 2012, when the Northern Bullants were renamed the Northern Blues and they adopted Carlton's navy blue colours, and the club split its home games between the VFL club's traditional home, the Preston City Oval; and Carlton's traditional home, Ikon Park.

Carlton terminated the affiliation with the Northern Blues in early 2020, as a cost saving measure during the COVID-19 pandemic, and re-established a dedicated reserves team in the VFL for the 2021 season.

Development systems
Under the AFL's 2016 plan to establish club-branded Next Generation Academies across Australia to give all AFL clubs a more active role in junior development, Carlton was allocated the northern metropolitan zone of Melbourne. The academy is linked to the Preston-based Northern Knights in the TAC Cup system.

Since 2019, the club has operated the Carlton College of Sports, a higher education institution in partnership with La Trobe University, which offers sports education diplomas and is operated out of the redeveloped grandstands at Ikon Park.

Women's teams

The Carlton Football Club operates two senior women's teams: one team in the national AFL Women's competition, which it has fielded since the 2017 AFLW season; and one team in the state VFL Women's competition, which has been fielded since the 2018 VFLW season.

History
Carlton was a key cog in the establishment of Women's football in the state of Victoria. In August 1933 the club hosted the first ever VFL sanctioned match between women's teams, with sides representing Carlton and Richmond. Though Richmond's side was not associated directly with the VFL club of the same name, the Carlton side was picked and trained by the club with VFL players Mickey Crisp and Ray Brew as coaches. The match, played at Carlton's home Princes Park drew an estimated crowd of 10,000 and raised funds as part of a VFL bye-week carnival for The Royal Melbourne Hospital.

The club next fielded a women's team more than a decade later when it competed in a 1947 charity exhibition series raising funds in support of food shortages in post-war Commonwealth countries. The club's team played multiple matches in multiple series that season including a match against Footscray in July and a subsequent series against , South Melbourne,  and Footscray in August 1947.

AFL Women's team

In June 2016, Carlton was granted a licence to establish and field a team in the eight team AFL Women's league, which is set to stage its inaugural season in February–March 2017. The team is run and fully integrated within the Carlton Football Club, with football operation overseen by existing Head of Football Andrew McKay. Damien Keeping served as the team's inaugural head coach, and the club's existing Female Football Ambassador, Lauren Arnell, served as the inaugural captain; she, along with Marquee players and Darcy Vescio and Brianna Davey were the club's inaugural marquee signings. In its short history, the team has played in one Grand Final, which it lost against Adelaide in 2019.

Current squad

VFL Women's team

Prior the 2018 season, Carlton was granted a licence to field a team in the VFL Women's competition. The VFLW team originally operated under a separate program to the club's AFLW team, however in 2021 the VFLW was formally aligned with the AFLW competition, similar to the men's AFL/VFL system.

See also

Wikipedia listing of Carlton players
List of Carlton Football Club coaches
Sport in Australia
Sport in Victoria

Footnotes
1. Specifically, Carlton's 19–1 record set a record for the best win–loss percentage across a full season, including finals, which stood until  broke it in the 2000 AFL season with a record of 24–1.
2. Harris had served two tenures as Carlton president: from 1965–1974, then from 1978–1979.
3. The "suburban grounds" is a collective term generally understood to mean all venues in Melbourne, except for the Melbourne Cricket Ground, Docklands Stadium and Waverley Park.

References

External links

 
 Blueseum – History of the Carlton Football Club

 
Australian rules football clubs established in 1864
Australian Football League clubs
Australian rules football clubs in Melbourne
1864 establishments in Australia
Former Victorian Football League clubs
AFL Women's clubs
Sport in the City of Melbourne (LGA)